Events in the year 1835 in India.

Incumbents
Sir Charles Metcalfe, Governor-General.

Events
28 January – Medical College, Bengal is established; later became Medical College Kolkata.
2 February – Madras Medical College is established.
 Aasam Rifle
 First British Indian Rupee

Law
English Education Act

Births
28 September – Sai Baba of Shirdi, guru, yogi and fakir (died 1918).
13 February – Mirza Ghulam Ahmad, Founder of the Ahmadiyya Muslim Community (died 1908).

Deaths

References

 
India
Years of the 19th century in India